Bellaspira pentagonalis is a species of sea snail, a marine gastropod mollusk in the family Drilliidae.

Description
The shell grows to a length of 10 mm.

The stout shell has a white tip. The whorls are whitish and the summits of the five ribs are brownish.  The ribs are continuous from base to summit and the cross-section of the shell forms an exact pentagon with rounded
angles. The ribs are not continuous, except accidentally. The other characters are closely similar to Fenimorea pagodula (Dall, 1889)

Distribution
This marine species occurs from North Carolina (Cape Hatteras) to Florida, and in the Gulf of Mexico off Western Florida and in the Caribbean Sea off Aruba and French Guiana.

References

 G., F. Moretzsohn, and E. F. García. 2009. Gastropoda (Mollusca) of the Gulf of Mexico, pp. 579–699 in Felder, D.L. and D.K. Camp (eds.), Gulf of Mexico–Origins, Waters, and Biota. Biodiversity. Texas A&M Press, College Station, Texas

External links
 
 McLean, James H., and Leroy H. Poorman. Reinstatement of the turrid genus Bellaspira Conrad, 1868 (Mollusca: Gastropoda) with a review of the known species. Los Angeles County Museum of Natural History, 1970

pentagonalis
Gastropods described in 1889